Batamaloo or Batmaloo, known as Batamalyun in kashmiri, is a locality in the Srinagar district, of Jammu and Kashmir, India. Batamaloo is derived from Batmoul, which is composed of the two words "batte", signifying cooked rice, and "moul", signifying father, in Kashmiri.Batmaloo was also famous for its Main Bus Stop, Where every Bus from every District will halt but later this bus stop was moved to Qamarwari and this caused major loss in business in Batmaloo area, Shopkeepers, Daily wedgers, Mechanics and others lost there business and those shops now looks like Haunting Places where no one comes.

Known For
Batamaloo is known for the annual Urs Mubarak of Sufi saint Sheikh Dawood Sahib popularly known as Batmol Sahib.

References 

Neighbourhoods in Srinagar